Natalia Alekseevna Khabibullina (born 18 December 2004) is a Russian pair skater. With her current partner, Ilya Knyazhuk, she is the 2021 JGP Austria champion, the 2021 JGP Russia silver medalist, and the 2022 Russian junior national champion.

Personal life 
Khabibullina was born on 18 December 2004, in Izhevsk, Russia, to parents Aleksei and Marina. She has a younger brother, Mikhail.

Career

Early years 
Khabibullina began learning to skate in 2008 as a four-year-old in her hometown of Izhevsk. She shares the same first coach as 2018 Olympic champion Alina Zagitova, Natalia Antipina. Khabibullina trained under Antipina as a single skater until the end of the 2015–16 season, after which she relocated to Moscow to train under Eteri Tutberidze and her coaching team at Sambo-70. She skated under Tutberidze for two seasons before transitioning to pair skating with her first partner, Ivan Balchenko, for the 2018–19 season.

Khabibullina/Balchenko competed together for just one season, coached by Sergei Dobroskokov in Moscow. They received one international junior assignment, the 2018 Ice Star, where they finished second behind Alina Pepeleva / Roman Pleshkov. The team split at the end of the 2018–19 season, leading Khabibullina to team up with her current partner, Ilya Knyazhuk.

2021–22 season: International junior debut 
Khabibullina/Knyazhuk made their international junior debut in September at the 2021 JGP Russia. They placed second in both the short program and the free skate to take the silver medal overall behind compatriots Ekaterina Chikmareva / Matvei Ianchenkov. At their second assignment, the 2021 JGP Austria in October, the team set new personal bests in both segments of competition, as well as overall, to take the title ahead of Russian teammates Anastasia Mukhortova / Dmitry Evgenyev and Georgian pair Karina Safina / Luka Berulava. Their placements across their two events qualified them to the 2021–22 Junior Grand Prix Final as the second-seeded team of four, but the event was later canceled due to concerns related to the discovery of the Omicron variant.

Khabibullina/Knyazhuk next made their debut at the senior-level Russian Championships in December. The team placed ninth in the short program and eighth in the free skate to finish seventh overall due to shifting ordinals. They were the highest-ranked of the teams competing internationally as juniors.

At the 2022 Russian Junior Championships the following month, Khabibullina/Knyazhuk narrowly won the title over Iuliia Artemeva / Mikhail Nazarychev with a strong free skate performance after placing second to the rival team in the short program.

Programs

With Knyazhuk

Competitive highlights 
JGP: Junior Grand Prix

With Knyazhuk

With Balchenko

Detailed results 

With Knyazhuk

 Senior results

References 

2004 births
Living people
Russian female pair skaters
Sportspeople from Izhevsk
21st-century Russian women